Hadım Ali Pasha (Turkish: Hadım Ali Paşa; died July 1511), also known as Atik Ali Pasha (Turkish: Atik Ali Paşa), was an Ottoman statesman and eunuch (hadım means "eunuch" in Turkish) of Bosnian origin. He served as governor of Rumeli, and led the Ottoman army in the Ottoman–Mamluk War of 1485–1491, but was defeated at Adana in 1488. He was then named Grand Vizier from 1501 to 1503, and again from 1509 to 1511. During his latter tenure, he led the suppression of the Alevi-led Şahkulu Rebellion, but died in battle near Sivas along with the rebel leader Şahkulu himself.

Life
He was from Drozgometva village in what is now  Bosnia and Herzegovina.

He served as governor of Rumeli, and led the Ottoman army in the Ottoman–Mamluk War of 1485–1491, but was defeated at Adana in 1488. He was then appointed grand vizier in 1501–1503, and again in 1509–1511. During his latter tenure he led the suppression of the Alevi-led Şahkulu Rebellion, but fell in battle near Sivas along with the rebel leader Shahkulu himself in July 1511.

Legacy
He had two eponymous mosques built in the Fatih district of Istanbul, one being the Gazi Atik Ali Pasha Mosque (completed 1497) in the Çemberlitaş neighborhood and the other being the Vasat Atik Ali Pasha Mosque (completed 1512) in the Karagümrük neighborhood.

See also
List of Ottoman Grand Viziers

References

16th-century Grand Viziers of the Ottoman Empire
Ottoman governors of Rumelia
15th-century births
1511 deaths
Eunuchs from the Ottoman Empire
16th-century Bosnian people
Ottoman military personnel killed in action
People from the Ottoman Empire of Bosnian descent
15th-century Bosnian people
1500s in the Ottoman Empire
1510s in the Ottoman Empire